The Geological Museum of Budapest or Hungarian Institute of Geology and Geophysics is the main museum of geology in Hungary. It is located on the Stefánia út in the western part of Pest.

The building was originally the home of the Hungarian Geological Society, which was established in 1869. The building was designed by Ödön Lechner in 1896. It still houses the Geological Institute of Hungary.

Its collection consists of minerals, prehistoric footprints, general information on Hungarian geology and its history, and an exhibition dedicated to Ödön Lechner.

External links
 Geological Museum of Hungary site

Museums in Budapest
Geology museums
Natural history museums in Hungary
Art Nouveau architecture in Budapest
Art Nouveau museum buildings
Visionary environments